María del Mar Rey (born 29 September 1968) is a Spanish former volleyball player who competed in the 1992 Summer Olympics.

References

1968 births
Living people
Spanish women's volleyball players
Olympic volleyball players of Spain
Volleyball players at the 1992 Summer Olympics